Red Willow Lake is a naturally formed lake located in Griggs County, North Dakota. The nearest town is Binford.

Red Willow Lake is an endorheic (closed) lake; it has no significant input or output of rivers or streams and is fed only by rain and natural springs.

Red Willow Lake first became recognized as a recreational resource in 1882.

References 

Lakes of North Dakota
Bodies of water of Griggs County, North Dakota